Emma Wiesner (born 11 November 1992) is an energy systems engineer from Sweden and politician of the Centre Party who has been a Member of the European Parliament since 4 February 2021.

Political career 
Wiesner started her political career as a 13 year old, after having seen Al Gore's film An Inconvenient Truth. After realizing that the environmental movement was her major political issue she chose to join the green liberal Centre Party, where she began regional chairman for the youth wing.

In the run-up to the 2019 European Parliament election, Wiesner was third on the Centre party list with a campaign slogan to bring "new energy to Europe" and wanting to increase the renewable energy in the union. The Centre party won two places in the election and even though Wiesner received more than 20,683 votes, it was not enough to reach over the threshold.

2021–present: Member of the European Parliament 
On 11 December 2020 it was announced that Wiesner was going to replace Fredrick Federley's seat in the European Parliament, after his resignation the same day. At 28 years of age, she became Sweden’s youngest member of the European Parliament.

In parliament Wiesner is a full member of the Committee on the Environment, Public Health and Food Safety and the Committee on Fisheries. She is also a substitute member of the Industry, Research and Energy committee (ITRE), the European Parliament Committee on Agriculture and Rural Development and the Special Committee for the Protection of Animals in Transport (ANIT)

References

External links 
 

Living people
1992 births
MEPs for Sweden 2019–2024
Centre Party (Sweden) MEPs
21st-century women MEPs for Sweden
21st-century Swedish women politicians